El Quetzal is a town and municipality in the San Marcos department of Guatemala.  It was recognised as municipality on 19 June 1900.  The major source of income is the agriculture.

"La Inmaculada Concepción" parish 

"La Inmaculada Concepción" (English:The Immaculate Conception") parish in La Reforma municipality was founded on 1 January 1956 and originally served both La Reforma and El Quetzal municipalities.  Its first priest was father Jaime López, a Franciscan, who led the parish until 5 March 1958.  His successor was father Juan Bartolomé Bueno, who was in charge until 31 July 1960, when father Pedro López Nadal, from Spain, took charge. On 23 April 1961, church construction was completed and it was opened and blessed by San Marcos dioceses Bishop, Celestino Fernández.  Father López Nadal led the parish until 25 January 1964, when father Juan Van Der Vaeren took his place.  In 1965, El Quetzal was elevated to parish and had its own priest, leaving La Reforma.

Climate

El Quetzal has tropical monsoon climate (Köppen: Am).

See also
 
 
 La Aurora International Airport
 Tapachula International Airport

References

External links
Some information about El Quetzal

Municipalities of the San Marcos Department